Opilo mollis is a species of beetles in the subfamily Clerinae.

See also 
 List of beetle species of Great Britain
 Coleoptera in the 10th edition of Systema Naturae

References 

 

Beetles described in 1758
Taxa named by Carl Linnaeus
Clerinae